"One" is the thirteenth single by Japanese singer Aimer, released on October 11, 2017 under SME Records. Written by Aimer (under her pen name "aimerrhythm") and Rui Momota, the single peaked at No. 2 on Oricon's singles charts and No. 3 on Billboard Japan's Hot 100.

Aimer debuted the song at her Nippon Budokan concert on August 29, 2017, calling it her "first dance song." She explained that "One" was a new chapter in her career after her compilation album Best Selection "noir" ended with the song "zero." The song expresses positivity and inspiration, with the "flag" as a symbol of starting over.

The single includes "Hana no Uta" (the ending theme of Fate/stay night: Heaven's Feel I. presage flower), "Rokutosei no Yoru Magic Blue ver." (Aimer's self-cover of her first single), and "Ito" (a Miyuki Nakajima cover).

Track listing

CD

DVD
First Production Limited Edition
"zero" (Music video)
 (Music video)

Music videos
One
Like her previous videos, Aimer herself does not appear on the music video of "One". The video, directed by Takeshi Maruyama, features dynamic shots of schoolgirls dancing, playing musical instruments, and performing synchronized flag dancing.

Hana no Uta
The music video for "Hana no Uta" was directed by Takahiro Miki and features actress Minami Hamabe.

Other uses
"One" was used by Japan Airlines in their commercials supporting the Japan Men's and Women's curling teams at the 2018 Winter Olympics in Pyeongchang.

Chart position

References

External links 
  (Aimer-web)
  (agehasprings)
  (Sony Music Entertainment Japan)
 "One" on quia
 
 
 ONE / Aimer on VGMdb

2017 singles
2017 songs
Aimer songs
SME Records singles
Japanese-language songs